The Diocese of Lake Malawi is one of the four dioceses in Malawi within the Church of the Province of Central Africa: the current bishop is Francis Kaulandai.

References

Anglicanism in Malawi
Lake Malawi
Anglican bishops of Lake Malawi